WYHW (104.5 FM) is a radio station broadcasting a Christian radio format. Licensed to Wilmington, North Carolina, United States, the station serves the Wilmington area. WYHW is currently owned by Bible Broadcasting Network.

History
"Gold 104" signed on in 1994 with an oldies format. The original call letters were WUOY. It used a satellite fed network oldies format with a local morning show hosted by Bob Dale. Paul Knight was the Managing Partner and General Manager. Bob Dale was Program Director. When the John Boy & Billy show was signed, the station eventually evolved into a hybrid format called "Rock-Talk 'n Roll" with John Boy & Billy in the morning, The Side Show with Bob Dale mid-days and the syndicated Don & Mike Show out of Washington D.C. in the afternoons.

In May 1996, Community Broadcasting sold radio stations WUOY, WMFD and WBMS to a new company called Ocean Broadcasting. At this time, WUOY changed from 1970s rock music to rock from the 1960s through the 1990s but kept John Boy and Billy.

For many years, this station was rock WRQR "Rock 104.5". In the Fall 1997 Arbitron ratings, WRQR was the top station reaching number 1, with John Boy and Billy.

In July 2004, NextMedia Group purchased WRQR, WAZO, and WMFD from Ocean Broadcasting LLC, and WKXB and WSFM from Sea-Comm Inc. In July 2008, Capitol Broadcasting announced its purchase of NextMedia's Wilmington stations.

WRQR lost John Boy and Billy to WKXS-FM on January 1, 2007. On January 2, 2007, Two Guys Named Chris from WKRR in Greensboro, North Carolina began airing on WRQR, the first station other than Rock 92 to carry the show.
  
The Will FM variety hits format and WILT call letters moved March 31, 2008, from what is now WRMR in Jacksonville, North Carolina for a better signal in Wilmington.

The station flipped to an Adult Contemporary format on February 2, 2009.

In February 2013, the station dropped all 1970s songs from its library and adjusted to a Bright A/C format featuring songs from the 2000s and 1980s songs.

On November 19, 2015, it was announced the Bible Broadcasting Network would buy WILT; the purchase was consummated on December 1, 2015 at a price of $300,000. As a result, the WILT calls and Sunny format moved to WBNE on December 1, and 104.5 flipped to Christian radio under the new callsign WYHW.

Previous logos

References

External links

Radio stations established in 1995
1995 establishments in North Carolina
Bible Broadcasting Network
YHW